Daubenya zeyheri  (Kunth) J.C.Manning & A.M.van der Merwe is one of 8 bulbous species in the genus, all endemic to the winter rainfall Strandveld of South Africa, and mostly growing on doleritic clays along the West Coast, Western Cape. It is closely related to Daubenya marginata (Willd. ex Kunth) J.C.Manning & A.M.van der Merwe. At first believed to consist of a single species, Daubenya aurea, the genus was expanded in 2000 to include the genera Androsiphon and  Amphisiphon and various species that had previously been classified as Polyxena, Massonia, or Neobakeria. "The poor congruence between morphological and other characters within Hyacinthaceae has also made generic circumscriptions very difficult. One of the consequences of this has been the recognition of a large number of genera that are poorly defined morphologically." - (Speta 1998) All 8 species have two spreading, prostrate leaves and tubular flowers that range from white to yellow or red, and in 6 of the species are followed by smooth glossy seeds within papery capsules that lend themselves to anemochory or wind dispersal. The inflorescence is produced at ground level on a sub-surface peduncle between the two leaves. Species are variously pollinated by bees, butterflies, moths, the monkey beetle Lepisia glenlyonensis and sunbirds. The water-retaining nature of doleritic clays ensures their remaining moist for longer than clays formed from shales of the Karoo series. Exceptionally D. namaquensis is found in deep red sands and D. zeyheri in calcareous coastal sands.

To attract pollinating sunbirds, pools of nectar form in the tubular flowers of Daubenya zeyheri. It is found growing along the coast between boulders and on calcareous sands between Paternoster and Langebaan, within a very small area of some 200 km2. Total population is estimated at no more than 6 500 plants, threatened by plant collectors, and habitat loss due to coastal development and limestone extraction. It has a sturdy pedicel supporting a corymbose inflorescence. When the fruits are mature the peduncle elongates rapidly as a prelude to dispersal of the seeds. The fruit is a papery capsule, inflated and three-angled, dehiscing loculicidally in the upper portion. The capsules fall free at maturity and disperse separately. The seeds are globose and black with a smooth testa, ranging 2–3 mm diam.

There is no formal conservation policy for Daubenya species and their future prospects remain bleak. Cultivated bulbs of D. aurea are on offer at commercial nurseries, though all the species are worthy of cultivation for their bright and often fragrant flowers.

Bibliography
'Systematics of the genus Daubenya' - Manning & van der Merwe (2002)

References

External links
Gallery of Daubenya species

zeyheri